Paolo Amorini (born 5 July 1937) is an Italian rower. He competed in the men's eight event at the 1960 Summer Olympics.

References

1937 births
Living people
Italian male rowers
Olympic rowers of Italy
Rowers at the 1960 Summer Olympics
Sportspeople from Livorno